Peter McSweeney (April 9, 1842 – February 2, 1921) was a merchant and political figure in New Brunswick, Canada. He sat for Northumberland division in the Senate of Canada from 1899 to 1921 as a Liberal.

He was born in Moncton, New Brunswick, the son of Peter McSweeney, an Irish immigrant, and Joanna Downing. He first went into business with his brothers, Edward and Thomas, who dealt in dry goods and furniture. In 1872, he married Wilhelmina Smith, the widow of H. Peter Fisher. McSweeney went into business on his own in 1877. He also served on Moncton town council.

References 
 
McSweeney Genealogy, Irish Canadian Cultural Association of New Brunswick
Canadian Parliamentary Guide, 1912, EJ Chambers

1842 births
1921 deaths
Canadian senators from New Brunswick
Canadian people of Irish descent
Liberal Party of Canada senators
People from Moncton